The Beehive (Persian title: Kandoo- )  is a 1975 Iranian Persian-genre drama film directed by Fereydun Gole and starring Behrouz Vossoughi, Davoud Rashidi, Jalal Pishvaeian and Reza Karam Rezaei.

Cast 
 Behrouz Vossoughi as Ebi
 Davoud Rashidi as Agha Hosseini
 Abbass Nazeri Nick as Karim

References

External links
 

1975 films
1970s action drama films
1975 romantic drama films
1970s Persian-language films
Romantic action films
Iranian romantic drama films
Films partially in color